The Kingdom of Tanahun was a petty kingdom in the confederation of 24 states known as Chaubisi Rajya.

List of monarchs

References 

Chaubisi Rajya
Former countries in South Asia
Tanahun
History of Nepal
T